KSYB (1300 AM) is a radio station licensed to serve the community of Shreveport, Louisiana. The station is owned by Amistad Communications, Inc., and airs a gospel music format.

The station was assigned the call sign KFLO by the Federal Communications Commission on August 26, 1974. The station changed its call sign to KSYB on July 27, 2002.

References

External links
 Official Website
 FCC Public Inspection File for KSYB
 FCC History Card for KSYB
 

Radio stations established in 1976
1976 establishments in Louisiana
Gospel radio stations in the United States
Caddo Parish, Louisiana
Christian radio stations in Louisiana